James Gavin may refer to:

James M. Gavin (1907–1990), general in the United States Army and ambassador to France
Jim Gavin (footballer) (born 1971), Dublin GAA
James Gavin (covenanter), tailor who had his ears cut off and was enslaved for refusing to renounce his faith
James Gavin (SOE), genral british army and HEAD SOE far east

See also
Gavin James (disambiguation)
James Galvin (disambiguation)